S. Philip Morgan (born 1953) is the Alan Feduccia Professor of Sociology at the University of North Carolina-Chapel Hill and a former Director of the Carolina Population Center. Morgan holds a master's and Ph.D. in sociology from the University of Arizona, and bachelor's in sociology from the University of North Carolina-Chapel Hill.

Awards 
 2014 Distinguished Professor of Sociology, University of North Carolina, Chapel Hill, NC
 2011 Recipient: Distinguished Career Award, Sociology of the Family Section, American Sociological Association 
 2008 Norb F. Schaefer Professor of International Studies, Duke University, Durham, NC
 2003 Elected President of the Population Association of America

References

External links 
http://fds.duke.edu/db/Provost/SSRI/CSDE/directors/pmorgan
http://www.asafamilysection.com/past-distinguished-career-award-recipients.html

1953 births
Living people
American sociologists
University of Arizona alumni
University of North Carolina at Chapel Hill alumni
University of North Carolina at Chapel Hill faculty